Carney is a village on the Maugherow Peninsula in County Sligo, Ireland.

Transport
Bus Éireann route 474 (Sligo - Drumcliffe - Maugherow) serves the village on Saturdays throughout the year and Mondays to Fridays during the school term.

See also
 List of towns in the Republic of Ireland

References

Towns and villages in County Sligo